Eleanor Island is an island in Prince William Sound, Alaska.

Islands of Alaska
Islands of Chugach Census Area, Alaska
Islands of Unorganized Borough, Alaska